Abis may refer to:

Places
 Abis, Philippines, in Negros Oriental Province
 ‘Abis, in Ma'rib Governorate, Yemen
 Abīs al Mustajaddah, in Beheira Governorate, Egypt

People
 Lucio Abis (1926–2014), Italian politician
 Mark Abis, British musician

Other uses
 Abis Mal, a character in Disney's Aladdin
 Abis interface, between BTS and BSC in GERAN
 ABIS, a software package by M2SYS Technology
 ABIS - Able Seaman Imagery Specialist, in Australian Navy

See also
 Ad Abis, Chah Salem Rural District, Central District, Omidiyeh County, Khuzestan Province, Iran
 Abi (disambiguation)